Tsega Melaku (born 1968) is an Israeli author, journalist, community activist and politician currently serving as a member of the Knesset for Likud. She is the former director of Kol Yisrael's Reshet Aleph ("Network A") radio station. Malku was disqualified from running in Israel's 2015 election with the Kulanu party, where it was believed she could become a Member of the Knesset. She then became an MK in 2023 after running with Likud in the previous year's election.

Early life and education
Melaku was born in Gondar, Ethiopia, and left her family in her native Ethiopia to emigrate to Israel in 1984 at the age of 16. She recalls that her first defense of her rights in Israel was to insist on keeping her first name, instead of adopting the Hebraicized "Oshra", a name given to her on her arrival. "When we arrived in Jerusalem, we thought that the people would greet us with open arms", she remembers. "But when we got here, everyone looked at us suspiciously and did not believe that we were really Jewish. I was shocked too, because I had never seen white Jews before. It was ironic really because they thought that we were the ones who weren't Jewish."

She attended Bar Ilan University, where she earned a BA in Political Science and Sociology. Then, while studying at Touro College in Jerusalem for her MA in business, she was one of the first Keren Hanan Aynor scholarship recipients.

Career
In 2008, when she was appointed to the position as director of the radio station Reshet Alef in 2008, she became the first woman and the first Ethiopian immigrant to hold that role. She described her goals for the station as breaking down "the elitist approach to culture in this country and make sure that everyone can get his say, not just those who are from Tel Aviv. I want everyone to be able to hold the microphone and speak out about issues." She is the manager and a presenter for an Amharic language radio show on Israel Radio’s Reka station. She has had a profound impact on the Ethiopian community, according to Len Lyons: "Under her direction, Amharic radio for the Ethiopian Israeli community has become an essential resource for education and social awareness.

She is a community activist in Israel's Ethiopian community. She was active in protests against Magen David Adom's policy on Ethiopian blood donations. A scandal ensued when it was revealed that blood from Ethiopians was thrown away out of fears it would contain HIV. Israel's Ethiopian community of over 100,000 people is grappling with profound economic challenges. A study completed in 2012 determined that Ethiopian immigrants constitute the worst-paid population in Israel. Ethiopian immigrants earn 30-40 percent less than Arabs in Israel.

Melaku works on behalf of several non-profit organizations that promote higher education for Ethiopian immigrants.

When he announced her candidacy for the Knesset, Moshe Kahlon, the Kulanu party leader, called her a woman of "fortitude and strong will". Melaku articulated her reasons for embracing a political career, which include the corruption and racism she has witnessed: "Until today, everywhere I go, one question follows me: 'Miss, I need my house cleaned twice a week. Are you free for cleaning?'", Melaku said. "Today, I say, 'Yes, I'm free to clean up. Not houses, but corruption. I'm ready to clean up opacity, to clean up seeing others as inferior because of their name, their accent, their skin colour."

After Melaku's candidacy was announced, Judge Salim Joubran, Chairman of the Central Election Committee, ruled that as a former broadcaster for the Reshet Aleph radio, Melaku would be disqualified from candidacy in the upcoming elections because she did not complete the 100-day "cooling-off" period since leaving her broadcasting job. The party disagreed with the decision, noting that her position as a manager was not a senior appointment and that the hiatus regulation should therefore not apply.

In February 2016, the Israeli Justice Ministry announced that the Israeli government had formed a new inter-ministerial task force to examine racism against Ethiopian-Israelis. The purpose is to create effective tools and methods to combat discrimination. There are three sub-teams within the task force, and Melaku will lead the one focused on raising public awareness of racism and enhancing the visibility of Ethiopian-Israeli Jews in the public sphere. 

In 2022, ahead of that year's legislative election, Melaku was given the thirty-seventh spot on Likud's electoral list by Benjamin Netanyahu. She was not elected to the Knesset as the party won 32 seats, but subsequently entered the Knesset on 9 February 2023 as a replacement for Ofir Akunis, who resigned under the Norwegian Law.

Publications

Melaku is the author of the book Not in Our School, which documents the racism she faced in her effort to have her children attend a better school.

References

External links 

1968 births
Living people
Bar-Ilan University alumni
Beta Israel
Black feminism
Ethiopian emigrants to Israel
Israeli feminists
Israeli people of Ethiopian-Jewish descent
Israeli women journalists
Israeli women writers
Jewish feminists
Jewish Israeli politicians
People from Gondar
Jewish Israeli anti-racism activists
Israeli radio people
Women radio directors
Members of the 25th Knesset (2022–)